The Rogue Valley AVA is an American Viticultural Area located in southern Oregon. The federal government approved this appellation in 1991. It is entirely contained within the larger Southern Oregon AVA and includes the drainage basin of the Rogue River and several tributaries, including the Illinois River, the Applegate River, and Bear Creek. Most wineries in the region are found in the valleys formed by one of these three tributaries, rather than along the Rogue River itself. Each river valley has a unique terroir, and grows different varieties of grapes. Overall, however, this region is the warmest and driest of Oregon's wine-growing regions.

Applegate Valley AVA 
The Applegate Valley AVA, established in 2000, is the only sub-AVA in the Rogue Valley AVA. The Applegate River flows through the town of Applegate and near the city of Jacksonville, which was the location of Oregon's first winery (the winery has been restored and re-opened as Valley View Winery). Grapes that thrive here include Merlot, Cabernet Sauvignon, Syrah, Chardonnay and Zinfandel, with Cabernet and Merlot being the dominant varietals.

Bear Creek Valley 
Bear Creek is the most populated of the Rogue River tributaries, as it flows through the cities of Medford and Ashland. The climate of the Bear Creek Valley is similar to that of Bordeaux, and it is well suited for cultivating varietals such as Cabernet Sauvignon, Merlot, Chardonnay, Cabernet Franc, Pinot gris, Sauvignon blanc, Malbec and Syrah.

Illinois Valley 
The westernmost tributary of the Rogue River is the Illinois River, which rises in southern Josephine County, in the Red Buttes Wilderness. The river flows generally northwest along the west side of the Klamath Mountains, past Cave Junction, Kerby and through the Siskiyou National Forest. The region is marked by high elevation, and is significantly influenced by marine climates. The region is well-suited for growing Burgundy varietals, similar to those grown in the Willamette Valley AVA.

References

External links 
 Rogue Valley Winegrowers Association

American Viticultural Areas
Oregon wine
Rogue River (Oregon)
Geography of Jackson County, Oregon
Geography of Josephine County, Oregon
2000 establishments in Oregon